A.Dd+ is an American hip hop duo from Dallas formed by Dionte "Slim Gravy" Rembert and Arrias "Paris Pershun" Walls. Having released their first album in 2011, they have been named "Best Hip-Hop Act" for two straight years by the Dallas Observer Music Awards. They have gone on three major tours: the Red Bull Texas Skooled Tour, the Black Milk Claps & Slaps Tour and the Talib Kweli Prisoner of Conscious Tour. The group broke up in January 2016.

Discography 

 Power Of The Tongue (2009)
 When Pigs Fly (2011)
 DiveHiFlyLo (2012)
 DiveHiFlyLo: Every Man Is King (2013)
 NAWF EP (2014)
 NAWF AMERICA (2016)

References

External links
 Official A.Dd+ Twitter

African-American musical groups
American musical duos
Hip hop duos
Southern hip hop groups
Musical groups established in 2009
Musical groups disestablished in 2016
Musical groups from Dallas
2009 establishments in Texas